Charles Spence Bate, FRS (March 16, 1819 – July 29, 1889) was a British zoologist and dentist.

Life
He was born at Trenick House near Truro, the son of Charles Bate (1789–1872) and  Harriet Spence (1788–1879). Charles adopted "Spence Bate" as his surname, perhaps to distinguish himself from his father, and used that name consistently in his publications; it was also used consistently by his contemporaries to refer to him.

He practiced dentistry first at Swansea, and then at Plymouth, taking over his father's practice. He was president of the Odontology Society.

He was an authority on the Crustacea, for which he was elected a fellow of the Royal Society in 1861, and a frequent correspondent of Charles Darwin, mostly concerning their shared interest in barnacles. Together with John Obadiah Westwood, he wrote "A history of the British sessile-eyed Crustacea" in 1868. He wrote reports on the crustaceans collected during the HMS Challenger expedition of 1872–1876.

He died on 29 July 1889, at The Rock, South Brent, Devon and was buried in Plymouth cemetery.

Family
On 17 June 1847, at Littlehempston church, near Totnes, he married Emily Amelia, daughter of John Hele and sister of the Rev. Henry Hele, the rector; she died on 4 April 1884, leaving two sons and a daughter. 
Bate married for a second time in October 1887.

Legacy
A number of species are named in his honour:
Pseudoparatanais batei (G. O. Sars, 1882)
Amphilochus spencebatei (Stebbing, 1876)
Scyllarus batei (Holthuis, 1946)
Costa batei (Brady, 1866)
Periclimenes batei (Holthuis, 1959)

References

Attribution

1819 births
1889 deaths
People from Swansea
British carcinologists
British zoologists
Welsh dentists
Fellows of the Royal Society
Fellows of the Linnean Society of London
19th-century dentists